The 2000 Kroger St. Jude International was a men's tennis tournament played on indoor hard courts in Memphis, United States, that was part of the ATP International Series Gold of the 2000 ATP Tour. It was the 30th edition of the tournament and was held from 14 February through 20 February. Magnus Larsson, who was seeded 16th,  won the singles title.

Finals

Singles

 Magnus Larsson defeated  Byron Black, 6–2, 1–6, 6–3
 It was Larsson's 1st singles title of the year and the 7th and last of his career.

Doubles

 Justin Gimelstob /  Sébastien Lareau defeated  Jim Grabb /  Richey Reneberg, 6–2, 6–4

References

External links
 ITF tournament edition details

Kroger St. Jude International
U.S. National Indoor Championships
Kroger St. Jude International
Kroger St. Jude International
Kroger St. Jude International